Čaušević is a common family name found in Bosnia and Herzegovina and neighbouring countries. It stems from the root çavuş, which was a term for military officers in the early Ottoman period, and a Slavic patronymic suffix -ević. It is the third most frequent surname in Bosnia and Herzegovina, ranked behind Hodžić and Hadžić. Its bearers are predominantly Bosnian Muslims. 

It may refer to:

Adnan Čaušević (b. 1990), Bosnian footballer
Džemaludin Čaušević (1870–1938), Bosnian Muslim imam
Ena Sandra Causevic (b. 1989), Danish model 
Sead Čaušević (b. 1949), Bosnian politician

See also
Chaush
Čaušić
Čauševići

Bosnian surnames